Pointe d'Andey is a mountain of Haute-Savoie, France. It lies in the Bornes Massif range. It has an altitude of  1877 metres above sea level.

Mountains of the Alps
Mountains of Haute-Savoie